Penicillium gladioli is a species of the genus of Penicillium which occurs on corms of the plant Gladiolus debtis. Penicillium gladioli produces gladiolic acid and patulin.

References

Further reading

 
 
 
 

gladioli
Fungi described in 1928